The following table is a list of films produced in Denmark or in the Danish language in the 1920s. For an alphabetical list of all Danish films currently on Wikipedia see :Category:Danish films. For Danish films from other decades see the Cinema of Denmark box below.

External links
 Danish film at the Internet Movie Database

1920s
Films
Lists of 1920s films

da:Danske film
nl:Lijst van Deense films